The 2007 Southampton Council election took place on 3 May 2007 to elect members of Southampton Unitary Council in Hampshire, England. One third of the council was up for election and the council stayed under no overall control.

After the election, the composition of the council was:
Conservative 18
Labour 18
Liberal Democrat 12

Campaign
Before the election the Conservative and Labour parties both had 16 seats, while the Liberal Democrats who formed the administration had 15 seats, with one seat, formerly Liberal Democrat, being vacant. 17 seats were being contested in the election, with 2 seats up in Millbrook after Liberal Democrat Virginia Moore resigned from the council.

In total 69 candidates were standing and as well as candidates from the national political parties, a couple of candidates stood for local parties called Southampton First and Southampton Save Our Services. They campaigned on local issues, with Southampton Save Our Services running on a platform calling for improved conditions for public sector workers in Southampton. Candidates also included a 20-year-old Conservative, Vince Capozzoli in Portswood, after the age for councillors was reduced from 21 to 18.

National politicians including Conservative leader David Cameron and Labour cabinet minister Peter Hain visited Southampton to campaign for their parties.

The council used an electronic system to check postal votes, but had to check them by hand after the system failed to read up to 40% of them.

Election result
The results saw no party win a majority, but the Liberal Democrats lost 4 seats, 2 each to the Conservative and Labour parties. The Conservatives won 9 of the 17 seats contested, to move to 18 seats, level with Labour, while the Liberal Democrats fell to 12 seats. One of the Conservative gains from the Liberal Democrats came in Swaythling and was put down to plans for a travellers' camp in the area, which had been opposed by the Conservative candidate. Overall turnout in the election was 30.2%.

Following the election Conservative group leader Alec Samuels was elected leader of the council. This came after one Liberal Democrat councillor, Norah Goss, voted in favour of a Conservative administration, breaking from the rest of the party who abstained.

Ward results

Bargate

Bassett

Bevois

Bitterne

Bitterne Park

Coxford

Freemantle

Harefield

Millbrook

Peartree

Portswood

Redbridge

Shirley

Sholing

Swaythling

Woolston

References

2007 English local elections
2007
2000s in Southampton